The 1987–88 season was the 103rd season in the history of Luton Town Football Club. It was Luton Town's 68th consecutive season in the Football League, and their 71st overall. It was also their sixth successive season in the First Division, and their 12th overall. The season is one of the club's most successful of all time, as Luton Town achieved a ninth-place finish in the league, won the Football League Cup, and reached the FA Cup semi-final and Full Members' Cup final. As League Cup winners, they would normally have qualified for the UEFA Cup, but were denied a first foray into European competition due to the ban on English clubs as a result of the 1985 Heysel disaster continuing for a fourth season.

Background

1982–83 saw Luton Town back in the First Division under David Pleat, making a final day escape from relegation at Maine Road through Raddy Antić. By 1985–86 Pleat had ensured that Luton had climbed to a ninth-place finish, but at the end of the season Pleat left to take up the reins at Tottenham Hotspur. Youth team manager and former player John Moore was promoted to manager, and former Fulham boss Ray Harford was brought in as his assistant. Due to the club's infamous ban on visiting supporters, 1986–87 saw Luton excluded from the Football League Cup. However, it proved to be Luton Town's best yet, as Moore and Harford took the club to their highest ever league finish; seventh. When Moore resigned after only one season, Harford was promoted to manager for the 1987–88 campaign.

Review

July–September

The promotion of Ray Harford to manager ensured a sense of continuity was maintained at Kenilworth Road, as Harford had been assistant to John Moore the previous season. Danny Wilson arrived from Brighton & Hove Albion during July in a £150,000 deal, as the club looked to build on their seventh-place finish the year before.

Luton started their assault on the First Division badly, not winning their first game of the campaign until the sixth time of asking with a 5–2 victory over Oxford United at the Manor Ground. A second victory followed the next week, as Luton beat Everton 2–1. Meanwhile, Harford continued to dabble in the transfer market – Scottish winger Mickey Weir arrived from Hibernian for £230,000, while Robert Wilson and Stacey North were sold to Fulham and West Bromwich Albion respectively. Days after the Weir transfer, Mike Newell was transferred to Leicester City. Two league defeats followed, at Charlton Athletic and Queens Park Rangers – but in between there was a winning start in the League Cup as Luton beat Wigan Athletic 1–0 at Springfield Park, courtesy of a goal from new signing Weir.

October–December

A Mick Harford goal was enough to secure a 1–1 draw against Manchester United at Kenilworth Road, and Harford bagged a hat-trick three days later as Luton trounced Wigan 4–2 in the second leg of the League Cup fixture. Harford scored a penalty at Fratton Park on the 10th, but it wasn't enough to prevent a 3–1 victory for Portsmouth. Ian Allinson signed from Stoke City for £10,000, and made his debut a week later as Luton beat Wimbledon 2–0.

The impact of a 1–0 home defeat to Liverpool was softened by subsequent success in the League Cup, as Coventry were routed 3–1 at Leicester City's Filbert Street. Three comfortable league victories followed, Luton keeping a clean sheet in every one, and the League Cup run continued with a 1–0 win at Ipswich. Defeat at Norwich City was followed by the derby match at Watford – Steve Foster's goal gave Luton a 1–0 victory. A draw and a loss followed, before Luton rounded off the calendar year with a 1–0 home win over Charlton.

January–March

New Year's Day saw a 3–0 home win over Chelsea – indeed, Luton went through the month unbeaten. The start of the club's FA Cup run saw victory at Hartlepool, while a draw and a victory in the league kept Luton comfortably in mid-table. The League Cup success continued, as Bradford City were beaten 2–0 at Kenilworth Road.

Oxford United then visited Kenilworth Road for one of the more remarkable fixtures of the year – Luton beat Oxford 7–4, as Mark Stein scored a hat-trick. Luton travelled to Oxford four days later for the League Cup semi-final first leg, and came out of the match with a 1–1 draw. Arsenal beat Luton 2–1 at Highbury, before Mickey Weir, who had just signed from Hibernian months before, returned to Hibernian on the 14th in a £200,000 move.

Luton achieved victory over Everton in the Full Members' Cup, and it then took a replay to knock Queens Park Rangers out of the FA Cup. The second leg in the League Cup against Oxford saw Luton run out 2–0 victors, with a place in the final against Arsenal as their prize.

March saw Luton win two successive matches in the Full Members' Cup, but also lose twice in a row in the league. The end of the month saw the Full Members' Cup final against Second Division Reading – Luton were defeated 4–1 at Wembley Stadium. Consolation was taken from a 4–1 victory over Portsmouth two days later.

April–June

Luton lost the FA Cup semi-final 2–1 to Wimbledon, and Luton only won once in the league during April. The League Cup Final against Arsenal came on the 24th, and Luton took an early lead through Brian Stein. Luton were overhauled by the opposition during the second half, and trailed 1–2 before a penalty was awarded to Arsenal with ten minutes left. Andy Dibble saved Nigel Winterburn's shot, and the Luton team rallied to equalise soon after through Danny Wilson. Stein scored the winner with the last kick of the game to bring the first ever piece of major silverware to Luton.

Following the League Cup victory, Luton drew at Norwich before beating Watford 2–1 at home to complete a double over their rivals. Tottenham Hotspur beat Luton 2–1 at White Hart Lane, before Luton finished the season with four consecutive 1–1 draws with Southampton, Liverpool and Nottingham Forest (twice). Luton achieved a ninth-place finish, to go with their cup achievements – an FA Cup semi-final place, a League Cup victory, and a Full Members' Cup final.

At the end of the season, Brian Stein left for French club SM Caen on a free transfer, while Emeka Nwajiobi retired from injury. Defender John Dreyer signed from Oxford United on 27 June for £140,000.

League table

Match results 

Luton Town results given first.

Legend

Football League First Division

{| class="wikitable"
|+
!Date!!Opponent!!Venue!!Result!!Attendance!!Scorers!!Notes
|-
|-style="background: #ffdddd;"
|15 August 1987||Derby County||align="center"|Away||align="center"|0–1||align="center"|17,204||align="center"|—||align="center"|
|-
|-style="background: #ffdddd;"
|18 August 1987||Coventry City||align="center"|Home||align="center"|0–1||align="center"|9,380||align="center"|—||align="center"|
|-
|-bgcolor="#ffffdd"
|22 August 1987||West Ham United||align="center"|Home||align="center"|2–2||align="center"|8,073||align="center"|Harford (2)||align="center"|
|-
|-style="background: #ffdddd;"
|29 August 1987||Chelsea||align="center"|Away||align="center"|0–3||align="center"|16,075||align="center"|—||align="center"|
|-
|-bgcolor="#ffffdd"
|31 August 1987||Arsenal||align="center"|Home||align="center"|1–1||align="center"|8,745||align="center"|Wilson (pen)||align="center"|
|-
|-style="background: #ddffdd;"
|5 September 1987||Oxford United||align="center"|Away||align="center"|5–2||align="center"|6,804||align="center"|Breacker, Harford, Hill, Nwajiobi, B. Stein||align="center"|
|-
|-style="background: #ddffdd;"
|12 September 1987||Everton||align="center"|Home||align="center"|2–1||align="center"|8,124||align="center"|B. Stein 18', Hill 50'||align="center"|
|-
|-style="background: #ffdddd;"
|19 September 1987||Charlton Athletic||align="center"|Away||align="center"|0–1||align="center"|5,002||align="center"|—||align="center"|
|-
|-style="background: #ffdddd;"
|26 September 1987||Queens Park Rangers||align="center"|Away||align="center"|0–2||align="center"|11,175||align="center"|—||align="center"|
|-
|-bgcolor="#ffffdd"
|3 October 1987||Manchester United||align="center"|Home||align="center"|1–1||align="center"|9,137||align="center"|Harford 19'||align="center"|
|-
|-style="background: #ffdddd;"
|10 October 1987||Portsmouth||align="center"|Away||align="center"|1–3||align="center"|12,391||align="center"|Harford (pen)||align="center"|
|-
|-style="background: #ddffdd;"
|17 October 1987||Wimbledon||align="center"|Home||align="center"|2–0||align="center"|7,018||align="center"|B. Stein, Wilson||align="center"|
|-
|-style="background: #ffdddd;"
|24 October 1987||Liverpool||align="center"|Home||align="center"|0–1||align="center"|11,997||align="center"|—||align="center"|
|-
|-style="background: #ddffdd;"
|7 November 1987||Newcastle United||align="center"|Home||align="center"|4–0||align="center"|7,638||align="center"|M. Stein 2', 62', Nwajiobi 75', B. Stein 87'||align="center"|
|-
|-style="background: #ddffdd;"
|14 November 1987||Sheffield Wednesday||align="center"|Away||align="center"|2–0||align="center"|16,960||align="center"|Allinson, M. Stein||align="center"|
|-
|-style="background: #ddffdd;"
|21 November 1987||Tottenham Hotspur||align="center"|Home||align="center"|2–0||align="center"|10,091||align="center"|Allinson (2)||align="center"|
|-
|-style="background: #ffdddd;"
|5 December 1987||Norwich City||align="center"|Home||align="center"|1–2||align="center"|7,002||align="center"|B. Stein||align="center"|
|-
|-style="background: #ddffdd;"
|12 December 1987||Watford||align="center"|Away||align="center"|1–0||align="center"|12,152||align="center"|Foster||align="center"|
|-
|-bgcolor="#ffffdd"
|18 December 1987||Southampton||align="center"|Home||align="center"|2–2||align="center"|6,618||align="center"|Harford, McDonough||align="center"|
|-
|-style="background: #ffdddd;"
|26 December 1987||Everton||align="center"|Away||align="center"|0–2||align="center"|32,128||align="center"|—||align="center"|
|-
|-style="background: #ddffdd;"
|28 December 1987||Charlton Athletic||align="center"|Home||align="center"|1–0||align="center"|7,243||align="center"|Wilson||align="center"|
|-
|-style="background: #ddffdd;"
|1 January 1988||Chelsea||align="center"|Home||align="center"|3–0||align="center"|8,018||align="center"|M. Stein 12, B. Stein 50, Harford 64'||align="center"|
|-
|-bgcolor="#ffffdd"
|2 January 1988||West Ham United||align="center"|Away||align="center"|1–1||align="center"|16,716||align="center"|M. Stein||align="center"|
|-
|-style="background: #ddffdd;"
|16 January 1988||Derby County||align="center"|Home||align="center"|1–0||align="center"|7,175||align="center"|McDonough||align="center"|
|-
|-style="background: #ddffdd;"
|6 February 1988||Oxford United||align="center"|Home||align="center"|7–4||align="center"|8,063||align="center"|Harford (2), McDonough, B.Stein, M.Stein (3)||align="center"|
|-
|-style="background: #ffdddd;"
|13 February 1988||Arsenal||align="center"|Away||align="center"|1–2||align="center"|22,612||align="center"|M.Stein||align="center"|
|-
|-style="background: #ffdddd;"
|5 March 1988||Wimbledon||align="center"|Away||align="center"|0–2||align="center"|4,854||align="center"|—||align="center"|
|-
|-style="background: #ffdddd;"
|15 March 1988||Coventry City||align="center"|Away||align="center"|0–4||align="center"|13,711||align="center"|—||align="center"|
|-
|-style="background: #ddffdd;"
|29 March 1988||Portsmouth||align="center"|Home||align="center"|4–1||align="center"|6,740||align="center"|B.Stein, M.Stein, Wilson, own goal||align="center"|
|-
|-style="background: #ffdddd;"
|2 April 1988||Newcastle United||align="center"|Away||align="center"|0–4||align="center"|20,752||align="center"|—||align="center"|
|-
|-bgcolor="#ffffdd"
|5 April 1988||Sheffield Wednesday||align="center"|Home||align="center"|2–2||align="center"|7,337||align="center"|McDonough, B. Stein||align="center"|
|-
|-style="background: #ffdddd;"
|12 April 1988||Manchester United||align="center"|Away||align="center"|0–3||align="center"|28,830||align="center"|—||align="center"|
|-
|-style="background: #ddffdd;"
|19 April 1988||Queens Park Rangers||align="center"|Home||align="center"|2–1||align="center"|6,735||align="center"|Foster, Wilson (pen)||align="center"|
|-
|-bgcolor="#ffffdd"
|30 April 1988||Norwich City||align="center"|Away||align="center"|2–2||align="center"|13,171||align="center"|M. Stein, Wilson (pen)||align="center"|
|-
|-style="background: #ddffdd;"
|2 May 1988||Watford||align="center"|Home||align="center"|2–1||align="center"|10,409||align="center"|Oldfield, Wilson (pen)||align="center"|
|-
|-style="background: #ffdddd;"
|4 May 1988||Tottenham Hotspur||align="center"|Away||align="center"|1–2||align="center"|15,437||align="center"|Grimes||align="center"|
|-
|-bgcolor="#ffffdd"
|7 May 1988||Southampton||align="center"|Away||align="center"|1–1||align="center"|12,722||align="center"|Wilson||align="center"|
|-
|-bgcolor="#ffffdd"
|9 May 1988||Liverpool||align="center"|Away||align="center"|1–1||align="center"|30,374||align="center"|Oldfield 30'||align="center"|
|-
|-bgcolor="#ffffdd"
|13 May 1988||Nottingham Forest||align="center"|Home||align="center"|1–1||align="center"|9,108||align="center"|Donaghy 5'||align="center"|
|-
|-bgcolor="#ffffdd"
|15 May 1988||Nottingham Forest||align="center"|Away||align="center"|1–1||align="center"|13,106||align="center"|Oldfield 2'||align="center"|
|}

FA Cup

Football League Cup

Full Members' Cup

 Player details Players arranged in order of starts (in all competitions), with the greater number of substitute appearances taking precedence in case of an equal number of started matches. Transfers 

In

Out

 Loans out 

See also
1987–88 in English football

Footnotes

A.  The FA Cup semi-final against Wimbledon on 9 April 1988 was played at White Hart Lane, home of Tottenham Hotspur.
B.  The Football League Cup Third Round match against Coventry City on 27 October 1987 was drawn as a home game for Luton, but was played at Filbert Street, home of Leicester City.
C.  The Full Members' Cup and Football League Cup Finals, played on 27 March and 24 April 1988 respectively, were both played at Wembley Stadium.
D.  The Full Members' Cup semi-final match against Swindon Town on 8 March 1988 was drawn at 1–1 after 90 minutes, and finished 2–1 after extra time.
E.  The £230,000 fee that brought Mickey Weir to Luton Town from Hibernian was set by a tribunal.

References
GeneralPlayer and match statistics sourced from: Match statistics sourced from:'' 
Specific

Luton Town F.C. seasons
Luton Town